Saint-Martin XIII are a French Rugby league club based in Saint-Martin-de-Crau, in Bouches-du-Rhône in the Provence-Alpes-Côte d'Azur region. The club currently play in the French National Division 1 which is the 3rd tier. Founded in 1974.

History 

Saint-Martin de Crau as they were originally known were founded in 1974 by Jean Chaput and began life in the local regional league. In season 79/80 they reached the Federal Division semi-finals and also during the 1980s they hosted the touring Moscow Spartak youth team, changed their name to Saint-Martin XIII and said farewell to founder and president Jean Chaput who stepped down. In 1995 the cadets(youth) team were crowned champions of France. The club reached the Federal Division final in 2000 and then won the Coupe Falcou in 2002. In 2013 they once again missed out on promotion when they lost out to AS Preixan at the semi-final stage. The following season though saw the club promoted to National Division 1 for the first time. In season 2015/16 the club enjoyed their best ever campaign reaching the end of season play-offs before losing to US Entraigues XIII

Honours 

 Coupe Falcou (1): 2002

See also
 National Division 1

References

External links
Official Website

1974 establishments in France
French rugby league teams
Rugby clubs established in 1974